Triozidae is one of seven families collectively referred to as jumping plant lice. They have traditionally been considered part of a single family, Psyllidae, but recent classifications divide the group into a total of seven families; most of the genera (over 70) remain in the Psyllidae, but Triozidae is the second-largest family in the group, containing 27 genera, and a number of pest species.

Genera

External links 
On the University of Florida / Institute of Food and Agricultural Sciences Featured Creatures website
 Ceropsylla sideroxyli, false-mastic psylla
 Trioza diospyri, persimmon psylla
 Trioza magnoliae, red bay psyllid
 Trioza alacris, bay leaf sucker
 Agriculture and biological sciences
 list of species of Triozidae

The World Psylloidea Database by D. Ouvrard: Triozidae in Psyl'list 

 
Insect vectors of plant pathogens
Hemiptera families